The Promised Land was a public radio program created and hosted by Majora Carter. It was produced by Launch Productions and distributed by American Public Media, and was most often heard on public radio stations in the United States. 

In 2008, Majora Carter and Marge Ostroushko co-produced the pilot episode of The Promised Land, which won a 3-way competition for a Corporation for Public Broadcasting Talent Quest <<link:0>>. The one-hour programs debuted on over 150 public radio stations across the US on January 19, 2009, and has since earned a 2010 Peabody Award.

Guests have included
Season 1:
Nalini Nadkarni, 
Audrey and Frank Peterman,
Brenda Palms Barber,
John Francis (environmentalist),
Winona LaDuke. 

Season 2:
Kyshun Webster,
Nat Turner,
Wilma Subra,
Vietnamese Fisherfolk,
Sharon Hanshaw.

Notes and references

External links 
 The Promised Land

American public radio programs
2009 radio programme debuts
2011 radio programme endings